The Twelfth Night Theatre is an established Australian entertainment venue located in Bowen Hills, in Brisbane, Queensland. Many notable actors, both international and Australian, have performed there.

The Twelfth Night Complex includes the main theatre and a smaller basement area which in recent years has been used as a dinner theatre.

History

Founding in the 1970s
Originally located on Wickham Terrace, Twelfth Night Theatre was relocated to its present location following the demolition of its former building due to the construction of the Turbot Street Bypass in 1971. Joan Whalley was the artistic director of Twelfth Night Theatre from 1962 - 1976. The land was sold in 1966 by Brian Johnstone and Marjorie Johnstone, who also owned the adjacent Johnstone Gallery.

Funds for the purchase were raised by the theatre, the Johnstones and the Myer family. The location of the new theatre designed by Vitaly Gzell, next door to the Johnstone Gallery in Cintra Road, Bowen Hills, was part of the Johnstones' attempt to create a cultural enclave embracing both performing and visual arts for Brisbane.

Notable production staged in the gardens of the Johnstone Gallery by Twelfth Night Theatre of productions included Aristophanes' Lysistrata, held between 24 April and 27 April 1962, with the set and costumes designed by Quentin Hole.

The 1967 program for the Johnstone Gallery included plans for a modern theatre at Cintra Road, Bowen Hills, which was to be linked to the gallery by gardens. The Johnstones anticipated a joint audience, and encouraged gallery clients to also become members of the theatre.

Prior to the commencement of the building of the theatre, a production of Under Milk Wood by Dylan Thomas was staged in a tent on the site of the future theatre. Twelfth Night Theatre operated its offices for a time in a house in Abbotsford Road which backed on to the future Theatre land.

Construction work commenced at the new site on 14 November 1969. In 1970, Johnstone Gallery openings were changed from the traditional Sundays to Friday evenings, due to the unexpectedly prompt completion of the theatre. Nonetheless, the theatre did not open until February 1971. The Johnstones were delighted, as Brian wrote to Sidney Nolan:

"...with the new half-million dollar theatre next door, the establishment is now nicely rounded off, so perhaps one of these days Marjorie and I will be able to play ladies and gentlemen of the art world!"

The Twelfth Night Theatre Club made headlines when it opened just before the theatre on 12 February 1971. The theatre club's "12 to 12 license was the first granted under provisions written into the liquor acts in a review last March". There was also significant for women in these new provisions, as suggested in "Sylvia's Woman to Woman" column:

"The official opening of the Twelfth Night Theatre Club on Tuesday night was the most exciting event of the week. It's cozy and intimate and snugly positioned in the basement of the soon-to-be-completed Twelfth Night Theatre complex at Bowen Hills... It's a club where women share equal status with men (at least we've made it in one field, girls) and it's the first place I've been in where I've been able to front up to the bar, order a drink from Barman Eddy, pay for it myself and still feel feminine..."

The Johnstones had loaned "magnificent pictures and sculptures" to the Club premises as an indication of their support.

Twelfth Night Theatre opened with two productions: A Flea In Her Ear by Georges Feydeau directed by Joan Whalley and The Rose and the Ring based on the work of William Makepeace Thackeray. The latter production was directed by Bill Pepper, former Head of Voice at the National Institute of Dramatic Art, NIDA, Sydney. Noted designer, Gloria Ida Logan worked on the production.

Among many other productions, a highlight was Guess Who's Coming to Dinner starring Frank Thring and Joan Whalley supported by a strong local cast. Whalley also directed the production.

In June 1972, however, Marjorie's failing health forced her resignation from the Twelfth Night Theatre Committee. Despite this, she continued to support the theatre and its work, as evidenced in the 1994 memorial to her by later owner Gail Wiltshire.

For years Twelfth Night Theatre had run a successful Junior Theatre Workshop, a training ground for many later successful actors. Tutors including such talent as June Finney, Judith McGrath and Carol Burns.

The building of Twelfth Night Theatre at Bowen Hills was a brave and enormous undertaking. Due to the cost of the new building, Twelfth Night Theatre Company, which was initially established as an amateur theatre company under foundation artistic director Rhoda Felgate in 1936, was forced to turn professional in a bid to gain financial support from both the Queensland and Australian governments. However, sufficient funding was not forthcoming and as a result, the theatre was sold to the State Government. Rather than seeing the theatre as a considerable cultural asset for the people of Brisbane, the Queensland government simply sold the theatre, in what can only be seen as a very short-sighted policy, to recoup monies spent. Queensland had no professional theatre company until the establishment of the Queensland Theatre Company in 1969. Considerable praise should be given to the role of Twelfth Night Theatre in the theatre history of Brisbane and Queensland. The current owner, Gail Wiltshire wrote of the deplorable state of the theatre building:

"When I moved into Twelfth Night Theatre in 1977, the challenges were enormous, almost impossible - a debt of $1.3 million, a vandalised theatre. I kept thinking of the women in my past - the long sea journey, the dray, the babies buried in small wooden coffins, the house with a mud floor. Nothing was too difficult. But then I had an immediate source of inspiration - Marjorie Johnstone. How I loved that amazing woman. She gave me courage. She pulled no punches about human nature. There are the good ones and the duds. Sometimes bastards. She was right.'" 

at the end of 1976, the original Twelfth Night Theatre Company folded. In 1979, the successor group, TN! Theatre Company was spun-off to operate solely as a performing company that would lease whatever premises as required for performance. In 1986 it took a 10-year lease of the Princess Theatre in Woolloongabba, and its last performance was in 1991 due to financial difficulties.

Later years
Twelfth Night Theatre is the only privately owned theatre in Australia, owned by Ken and Gail Wiltshire. It is not controlled by any commercially funded or government organisation and receives no public grants from either the Queensland State or Australian federal governments.

The Twelfth Night Theatre continues as a contemporary theatre and has attracted over a number of years various British comedies starring such well-known actors as John Inman from the long-running television series, Are You Being Served, Gorden Kaye and Sue Hodge from Allo Allo. Other commercial productions have included Blithe Spirit by Noël Coward starring Rowena Wallace and June Salter.

In 2007, an Australian season of Allo Allo was staged starring actors from the original British television series, Gorden Kaye, Guy Siner and Sue Hodge.

Stagedoor Dinner Theatre has run dinner theatre shows in the basement theatre for seven years.

Notable performers
Australian actors, who have appeared at the theatre, include:

 Tony Bonner
 Carol Burns
 Claire Crowther
 Penny Downie
 Jon English
 Beverly Langford
 Judith McGrath
 June Salter
 Sigrid Thornton
 Frank Thring
 Rowena Wallace
 Kate Wilson

Selected recent productions

References

Books and Archival Information

External links
Twelfth Night Theatre website Official theatre website.
Johnstone Gallery Archive Provides a comprehensive history of the theatre using primary sources from the time.

Theatres in Brisbane
Bowen Hills, Queensland